Batlapalem is a village located in Amalapuram Mandal, East Godavari district, Andhra Pradesh, India.

Villages in East Godavari district